Sports science is a discipline that studies how the healthy human body works during exercise, and how sport and physical activity promote health and performance from cellular to whole body perspectives. The study of sports science traditionally incorporates areas of physiology (exercise physiology), psychology (sport psychology), anatomy, biomechanics (sports biomechanics), biochemistry, and kinesiology. Sports scientists and performance consultants are growing in demand and employment numbers, with the ever-increasing focus within the sporting world on achieving the best results possible. Through the scientific study of sports, researchers have developed a greater understanding of how the human body reacts to exercise, training, different environments, and many other stimuli.

Origins of exercise physiology 

 Sports science can trace its origins to ancient Greece. The noted ancient Greek physician Galen (131–201) wrote 87 detailed essays about improving health (proper nutrition), aerobic fitness, and strengthening muscles.

New ideas upon the working and functioning of the human body emerged during the Renaissance as anatomists and physicians challenged the previously known theories. These spread with the implementation of the printed word, the result of Gutenberg's printing press in the 15th century. Allied with this was a large increase in academia in general, universities were forming all around the world. Importantly these new scholars went beyond the simplistic notions of the early Greek physicians, and shed light upon the complexities of the circulatory, and digestive systems. Furthermore, by the middle of the 19th century, early medical schools (such as the Harvard Medical School, formed 1782) began appearing in the United States, whose graduates went on to assume positions of importance in academia and allied medical research.

Medical journal publications increased significantly in number during this period. In 1898, three articles on physical activity appeared in the first volume of the  American Journal of Physiology. Other articles and reviews subsequently appeared in prestigious journals. The German applied physiology publication,  Internationale Zeitschrift fur Physiologie einschliesslich Arbeitphysiologie  (1929–1940; now known as the European Journal of Applied Physiology and Occupational Physiology), became a significant journal in the field of research.

A number of key figures have made significant contributions to the study of sports science: 
 Austin Flint, Jr., (1836–1915) One of the first American pioneer physicians, studied physiological responses to exercise in his influential medical textbooks.
 Edward Hitchcock, Jr., (1828–1911) Amherst College Professor of Hygiene and Physical Education, devoted his academic career to the scientific study of physical exercise, training and the body. Coauthored 1860 text on exercise physiology.
 George Wells Fitz, M.D. (1860–1934) Created the first departmental major in Anatomy, Physiology, and Physical Training at Harvard University in 1891.
 August Krogh (1874–1949) Won the 1920 Nobel prize in physiology for discovering the mechanism that controlled capillary blood flow in resting or active muscle.
 Per-Olof Åstrand (1922–2015) Professor at the Department of Physiology, Karolinska Institute, Stockholm. Wrote a seminal paper which evaluated the physical working capacity of men and women aged 4–33 years.

Study of sports science 
A notable amount of research in the field of sports science is completed at universities or dedicated research centers. Higher-education degrees in Sports Science or Human Physiology are also becoming increasingly popular with many universities now offering both undergraduate, postgraduate and distance learning degrees in the discipline. Opportunities for graduates in these fields include employment as a Physical Education teacher, Dietician or Nutritionist, Performance Analyst, Sports coach, Sports therapist, Fitness center manager, Sports administrator, Strength and Conditioning specialist or retail manager of a Sports store. Graduates may also be well-positioned to undertake further training to become an accredited Physiotherapist, Exercise Physiologist, Research Scientist and Sports Medical Doctor.

Sports science may also be useful for providing information on the aging body. Older adults are aware of the benefits of exercise, but many are not performing the exercise needed to maintain these benefits. Sports science provides a means of allowing older people to regain more physical competence without focusing on doing so for the purposes of anti-aging. Sports science can also provide a means of helping older people avoid falls and have the ability to perform daily tasks more independently.

In Australia the majority of sports science research from 1983 to 2003 was done in laboratories and nearly half of the research was done with sub-elite or elite athletes. Over two-thirds of the research was done regarding four sports: rowing, cycling, athletics, and swimming. In America, sports play a big part of the American identity, however, sports science has slowly been replaced with exercise science. Sports science can allow athletes to train and compete more effectively at home and abroad.

José Mourinho, a football manager who won UEFA Champions League twice, reflected his studies of sport science as "sometimes it is difficult to understand if it is sport or if it is science".

Academic journals in sports science 
 Journal of Applied Biomechanics
 International Journal of Computer Science in Sport
 Journal of Strength & Conditioning Research
 Journal of Swimming Research
 Sports
 Medicine & Science in Sports & Exercise
 Journal of Science and Medicine in Sport

Reproducibility
A 2018 study criticized the field of exercise and sports science for insufficient replication studies, limited reporting of both null and trivial results, and insufficient research transparency. Statisticians have criticized sports science for common use of magnitude-based inference, a controversial statistical method which has allowed sports scientists to extract apparently significant results from noisy data where ordinary hypothesis testing would have found none.

See also 
 Kinesiology
 Kinanthropometry
 Sports biomechanics
 Sports medicine
 Computer science in sport

References

External links 
 British Association of Sport and Exercise Sciences
 American College of Sports Medicine
 European College of Sport Science
 Exercise & Sports Science Australia
 National Strength & Conditioning Association

 
Applied sciences